Green Township is one of the fifteen townships of Adams County, Ohio, United States.  The 2010 census found 651 people in the township, 557 of whom lived in the unincorporated portions of the township.

Geography
Located in the southeastern corner of the county along the Ohio River, it borders the following townships:
Brush Creek Township - north
Jefferson Township - northeast
Nile Township, Scioto County - east
Monroe Township - west
Lewis County, Kentucky lies across the Ohio River to the southwest.

It is the most southerly township in Adams County.

The village of Rome is located in central Green Township along the Ohio River.

Name and history
Green Township is named for General Nathanael Greene. It is one of sixteen Green Townships statewide.

Government
The township is governed by a three-member board of trustees, who are elected in November of odd-numbered years to a four-year term beginning on the following January 1. Two are elected in the year after the presidential election and one is elected in the year before it. There is also an elected township fiscal officer, who serves a four-year term beginning on April 1 of the year after the election, which is held in November of the year before the presidential election. Vacancies in the fiscal officership or on the board of trustees are filled by the remaining trustees.

References

External links
County website

Townships in Adams County, Ohio
Townships in Ohio